Stella is an unincorporated community in Cowlitz County, Washington. Stella is located northwest of the city of Longview, reached by traveling westbound out of the city along Washington State Route 4, also known as Ocean Beach Highway, and turning north onto Stella Road. The Stella community is part of the Longview School District, a K-12 school district of about 6,600 students.

The community was named after Stella Packard, the daughter of a local merchant.

Geography
Stella is located at  (46.1906660, -123.1198407).

Further reading

References

External links
Longview Public Schools website

Unincorporated communities in Cowlitz County, Washington
Unincorporated communities in Washington (state)